SIIMA Award for Best Director – Telugu is presented by Vibri media group as part of its annual South Indian International Movie Awards, for best film direction done by a director in Telugu films. The award was first given in 2012 for films released in 2011. Trivikram Srinivas is the most nominated with 5 nominations while S. S. Rajamouli, Trivikram Srinivas, Sukumar and Vamshi Paidipally are the most awarded directors with two wins each.

Superlatives

Winners

Nominations 

 2011: Srinu Vaitla – Dookudu
 V. V. Vinayak – Badrinath
 K. Dasarath – Mr. Perfect
 Sukumar – 100% Love
 Bapu – Sri Rama Rajyam
 2012: Harish Shankar – Gabbar Singh
 S. S. Rajamouli – Eega
 Vikram Kumar – Ishq
 Trivikram Srinivas – Julai
 Puri Jagannadh – Businessman
 2013: Trivikram Srinivas – Attarintiki Daredi
 Koratala Siva – Mirchi
 Srikanth Addala – Seethamma Vakitlo Sirimalle Chettu
 Vijaykumar Konda – Gunde Jaari Gallanthayyinde
 V. V. Vinayak – Naayak
 2014: Surender Reddy – Race Gurram
 Srivass – Loukyam
 Boyapati Srinu – Legend
 Vikram Kumar – Manam
 Srikanth Addala – Mukunda
 2015: S. S. Rajamouli – Baahubali: The Beginning
 Gunasekhar – Rudramadevi
 Koratala Siva – Srimanthudu
 Krish – Kanche
 Maruthi – Bhale Bhale Magadivoy
 2016: Vamsi Paidipally – Oopiri
 Boyapati Srinu – Sarrainodu
 Koratala Siva – Janatha Garage
 Sukumar – Nannaku Prematho
 Trivikram Srinivas – A Aa
 2017: S. S. Rajamouli – Baahubali 2: The Conclusion
 Krish – Gautamiputra Satakarni
 Sandeep Reddy Vanga – Arjun Reddy
 Sankalp Reddy – Ghazi
 Satish Vegesna – Sathamanam Bhavati
 2018: Sukumar – Rangasthalam
 Indraganti Mohan Krishna – Sammohanam
 Nag Ashwin – Mahanati
 Parasuram – Geetha Govindam
 Trivikram Srinivas – Aravinda Sametha Veera Raghava
2019: Vamshi Paidipally – Maharshi
B. V. Nandini Reddy – Oh! Baby
Puri Jagannadh – iSmart Shankar
Anil Ravipudi – F2: Fun and Frustration
Gowtam Tinnanuri – Jersey
Shiva Nirvana – Majili
2020: Trivikram Srinivas – Ala Vaikunthapurramuloo
Anil Ravipudi – Sarileru Neekevvaru
Venky Kudumula – Bheeshma
Venkatesh Maha – Uma Maheswara Ugra Roopasya
Mohana Krishna Indraganti – V
2021: Sukumar – Pushpa: The Rise
 Boyapati Srinu – Akhanda
 Gopichand Malineni – Krack
 Anudeep K. V. – Jathi Ratnalu
 Rahul Sankrityan – Shyam Singha Roy
 Prasanth Varma – Zombie Reddy

See also 

 Tollywood
 South Indian International Movie Awards

References 

Best Actor Telugu
South Indian International Movie Awards winners
Awards for best director